Ben Barker may refer to:

 Ben Barker (racing driver) (born 1991), British racing driver
 Ben Barker (speedway rider) (born 1988), British speedway rider